Gölbaşı is a town of Adıyaman Province of Turkey. It stands between Malatya and Gaziantep cities. It is the seat of Gölbaşı District. Its population is 33,373 (2021). The town is next to Lake Gölbaşı.

İskender Yıldırım (CHP) is the incumbent mayor of this town since the 2019 local elections.

References 

Gölbaşı District, Adıyaman
Populated places in Adıyaman Province
Towns in Turkey